Dictyonosteus is a genus of prehistoric coelacanth fish which lived during the Late Devonian period. Fossils have been found in Spitsbergen, Norway.

References 

Prehistoric lobe-finned fish genera
Devonian fish of Europe